Uniform boundedness conjecture may refer to:

 Uniform boundedness conjecture for torsion points
 Uniform boundedness conjecture for rational points
 Uniform boundedness conjecture for preperiodic points

See also

 Uniform boundedness
 Uniform boundedness principle